Arkansas's 2nd congressional district is a congressional district located in the central part of the U.S. state of Arkansas and includes the state capital of Little Rock, its suburbs and surrounding areas. The district leans Republican, with a Cook PVI rating of R+9. However, due to the influence of heavily Democratic Little Rock, it is still considered the least Republican congressional district in the state, which has an all-Republican congressional delegation.

It is represented in the United States House of Representatives by Republican French Hill.

Voting

List of members representing the district

Recent election results

2002

2004

2006

2008

2010

2012

2014

2016

2018

The 2018 election was held on November 6, 2018.

2020

2022

Notes
Arkansas will hold their Primary Elections on May 24, 2022 – a process which the State of Arkansas calls a Preferential Primary Election. If no candidate in a contested Primary Election receives 50% of the vote or more of the vote, than a Runoff Primary Election will be held on June 21, 2022 – a process which the State of Arkansas calls a General Primary Election.

There are currently five declared candidates for Arkansas’ 2nd Congressional District for the 2022 Election Cycle.

The incumbent office holder is denoted by an *. Any rumored candidates are denoted by an +.

Arkansas will hold their General Election on November 8, 2022. If no candidate in a contested General Election race receives 50% or more of the vote, than a General Runoff Election will be held on December 8, 2022.

References
Specific

General

 Congressional Biographical Directory of the United States 1774–present

02